The 1968 Columbia Lions football team represented Columbia University in the 1968 NCAA University Division football season. They were led by first-year head coach Frank Navarro and played their home games at Baker Field. They were a member of the Ivy League. They finished the season 2–7 overall and 2–5 in Ivy League play to place fifth.

Schedule

References

Columbia
Columbia Lions football seasons
Columbia Lions football